Thomas L. Hayes (May 30, 1926 – May 5, 1987) was the 71st lieutenant governor of Vermont and a Vermont Supreme Court Justice. He was appointed to the Supreme Court in 1985 by then-Governor Madeleine M. Kunin.

Biography
Thomas Lawlor Hayes was born in Fair Haven, Vermont on May 30, 1926.  He was educated in Fair Haven, and graduated from Bellows Falls High School.  Hayes served in the Army from 1944 to 1946 as an Infantry and Signal Noncommissioned officer in the Pacific Theater.

He graduated from the University of Vermont in 1950 and joined the staff of Winston Prouty, who served in the United States House of Representatives and as a United States senator.  Hayes remained with Prouty for 15 years and advanced to the position of Administrative Assistant in his Washington office.  He received a law degree from Georgetown University in 1955.

In 1966 Hayes, then residing in Middlebury, ran unsuccessfully for governor, and lost the Republican nomination to Richard A. Snelling.  He was the successful Republican nominee for lieutenant governor in 1968 and served one term, 1969 to 1971.  Active in opposition to the Vietnam War, he made national headlines in 1970 when, as acting governor, he ordered Vermont flags lowered to half staff after the killing of four students at Kent State University by National Guard troops.  In response Governor Deane Davis returned to Vermont from a conference and countermanded Hayes's directive.

Hayes ran unsuccessfully against Davis for governor in the 1970 Republican primary.  He later became a Democrat, and resided in Burlington.  He served as Legal Counsel to Governor Thomas P. Salmon, was chairman of the Vermont State Board of Education, and was appointed a Judge of the Superior Court.  While on the Superior Court, he served as chief administrative judge.

In 1985, Hayes was appointed a justice of the Vermont Supreme Court, succeeding Wynn Underwood; Hayes served in this position until his death.  He was an advocate of attorneys paying greater attention to state constitutions generally, and the Vermont constitution in particular, and suggested that too much deference was paid to "buzzwords" from federal court decisions.  In Vermont v. Jewett, Hayes argued that state constitutions should serve as consistent protection for the rights and liberties of a state's citizens, no matter how the decisions of the federal courts ebbed and flowed as membership and political outlook changed over time.

At the time of his death he faced Judicial Conduct Board charges for alleged misconduct along with fellow justices William C. Hill and Ernest W. Gibson III.  Hill retired, and Vermont Judicial Conduct Board charges against Gibson were dropped in August, 1987. (Wheel was later convicted on charges arising from the case; Hill was found to have violated rules regarding judicial conduct.)

Hayes died in Boston, Massachusetts on May 5, 1987 while being treated for lung cancer.  He was buried at Saint Marys Cemetery in Fair Haven.

He was married to Jennie Christy.  They had three children, two sons and a daughter.

References

Sources

Magazines

Books

Newspapers

Internet

1926 births
1987 deaths
Lieutenant Governors of Vermont
Justices of the Vermont Supreme Court
Vermont state court judges
University of Vermont alumni
Georgetown University Law Center alumni
Vermont Republicans
Vermont Democrats
United States Army personnel of World War II
People from Middlebury, Vermont
People from Burlington, Vermont
Vermont lawyers
20th-century American judges
20th-century American lawyers
United States Army officers